Hsarat (also spelled Hisarat, Hasrat, Hsarate, Ḩaşrāt, Hsârâte, Hsarale or Ḩişārāt)  is a village in the Byblos District of the Keserwan-Jbeil Governorate, Lebanon. Its inhabitants are predominantly Maronite Catholics.

References

Populated places in Byblos District
Maronite Christian communities in Lebanon